Tippecanoe Lake is a large, glacially created lake in Leesburg, Kosciusko County, Indiana and, at 123 feet deep (37,5 meters), is the deepest natural lake in the state.

Location
Tippecanoe Lake is about two miles west of the town of North Webster, Indiana, and Webster Lake with the small unincorporated area of Oswego (now located in Leesburg, Indiana) located near its west-northwestern shore.

Recreation
Tippecanoe Lake is used mostly for recreational purposes such as fishing, boating and skiing, and is surrounded mostly by residential housing. A prominent historical location is on the southwest shore of the lake: Tippy Dance Hall. Built in the late 1950s, the unique building (covered and open air) hosted many musical artists such as Duke Ellington, Louis Armstrong and the 1960s act The Byrds. From the mid 1980s through 2016, Tippy Dance Hall was a teen dance club with Saturday night dances from Memorial Day until just after Labor day. However it is now for sale, and the teen dance club is no longer operating.

Geographic place names
Bel Rohr Park is on Patona Bay on Tippecanoe's extreme northwest shore. Patona Bay Resort and Patona Bay Marina are found there. 
Black's Landing is on Tippecanoe's northern shore across from Government Point.
Forest Glen is on Tippecanoe's central western shore and east of Stanton Lake.
Government Point is located on Tippecanoe's southern shore, just north of Pie-Eyed Petey's Marina and just east of Indian Hills Golf Course.  
Kalorama Park is opposite Forest Glen on Tippecanoe's northern shore. This is also the home of Tippecanoe Lake Country Club. 
Mineral Springs is on Tippecanoe's southeastern shore.
Stony Ridge is on Tippecanoe's northwestern shore and across Patona Bay from Bel Rohr Park.
Walker's Landing is on Tippecanoe's northern shore west of Black's Landing.

Establishments

Tippecanoe Lake Country Club
Tippecanoe Lake Country Club is a private club and one of the lake's largest attractions. It is north of Kalorama Park at 7245 N Kalorama Road and accessed from Indiana State Road 13 via Kosciusko County Roads E650N and E800N. TLCC, a private club, was opened on April 15, 1926, with the clubhouse opening on June 11 of that year. The club joined the Chicago District Golf Association in the 1950s. From 1959 through the early 1960s, the club also hosted LPGA tournaments. Professionals such as Kathy Cornelius of Phoenix, Arizona, and Mickey Wright of Port St. Lucie, Florida, played Tippecanoe. Aside from golf, T.L.C.C. also provides tennis, swimming and boating, and holds a fireworks display for the 4 July.

Marinas
Patona Bay Marina and Resort

Patona Bay Marina is located on the west shore of Lake Tippecanoe. The marina is a dealership complemented by a full-service parts and service department. Patona Bay sells Starcraft brand boats, and also sells all types of used boats, personal watercraft, boat engines, etc. The marina also offers boat and kayak rentals, daily or weekly. The marina offers boat storage for a fee, and installation and removal of both boats and boat lifts at the beginning and end of the boating season.

Patona Bay Resort has existed since the 1920s. Owned by the multi-generational Paton family, it has grown into several-hundred unit seasonal resort, which allows patrons to pay seasonal rent to reside at the Resort during the summer months (late April to early October). The park also offers limited weekend/weekly lot rentals for those that have mobile campers or RVs. There is also a small tent camping section available. Seasonal park residents own their homes but must rent the lots on a yearly basis. The resort offers seasonal pier space rentals as well, for a fee. As the real estate prices for individual homes on Lake Tippecanoe have reached nearly $450,000 for a small cottage (roughly 1,200 square feet), Patona Bay Resort is a relatively affordable way for families to enjoy the lake in the summer without the hassle of a year-round mortgage. The resort also includes a snack bar with a small arcade, a free library and reading area for children, and features a nostalgic lake theme. It is generally open from mid-May to just after Labor Day. Patona Bay also provides a private swimming beach with several areas for children to play, and other amenities such as a pet walk for dogs, as well as family events during the summer holiday weekends.

Pie-Eyed Petey's Restaurant and Bar

EDIT: Pie-Eyed Petey’s closed unexpectedly just before Memorial Day 2018, and remains closed to date. The marina and gas pumps are operating on a limited basis at this time. There is a rumor the property is for sale but this cannot be positively confirmed. Please check back for updates.

Pie-Eyed Petey's Restaurant and Bar, occupying the former site of Plaza Marina, is a full-service  restaurant/bar, with a limited marina and fueling services. The marina offers a limited selection of boating accessories, as well as a store with T-shirts, hand painted signs  and other lake-oriented accessories.

Pie-Eyed Petey's is the only full-service restaurant and bar on the lake. The menu consists of pizzas, subs, tenderloins, chicken fingers, hamburgers, etc. The decor in the bar reflects Lake Tippecanoe's heritage; from the early days of pull-start outboard  motors hanging on the wall, to water skis dating from the 1960s, to the teak MasterCraft Decks from the 1990s, this eatery has a strong flair for Lake Tippecanoe nostalgia. A newly completed "Tiki" Bar is located outdoors, with flat-screen TVs and a full-service bar to serve outdoor patrons. The outdoor dining area has grown in recent years, and much of it is covered by canopies, with large outdoor heaters if the temperatures require them. Most recently, a red lighthouse has been constructed just onshore.

Tippecanoe Boat Co Inc

Tippecanoe Boat Co. Inc. is a marina on the northeast side of Lake Tippecanoe. The access point is through a long channel which is clearly marked by a large sign, underneath a footbridge, and into a lagoon. Gas is available at TBC, and there is a full boat dealership as well.

Public access
Public access to Tippecanoe Lake is available via:
Grassy Creek, a tributary that connects, by way of a manually operated lock, the east shore of Tippecanoe Lake to Sawmill, Sechrist, Banning, Irish, Little Barbee, Big Barbee and Kuhn lakes upstream. The ramp is on the east shore of the creek along Armstrong Road, just north of the lock.
Patona Bay Resort on the northwest shore
Tippy Dance Hall on the southwest shore
Tippecanoe Boat Company on the northeast shore
Pie-Eyed Petey's Marina and Restaurant on the southeast shore

Drainage
Tippecanoe is drained by the Tippecanoe River which flows generally south to the Wabash River. The river ends near Battle Ground, Indiana, in Tippecanoe county.

Two reservoirs, Lake Shafer and Lake Freeman, are fed by the Tippecanoe River. The reservoirs both have dams controlling inflow from the Tippecanoe River.

Notable residents

A notable resident was Chris Schenkel. Schenkel announced the Triple Crown horse races and the Masters Tournament on CBS. With ABC Sports he was Olympic anchorman, college football, NBA, and PBA bowling announcer.

Lore
A famous myth concerning Lake Tippecanoe is that the "bottom" of the lake is a false bottom made up of silt, under which lies a spring that extends  feet below the surface of the lake. Other myths are that somewhere in the lake lies a crashed airplane (either a B-17 Flying Fortress or a small private airplane, depending on who you talk to) and that SCUBA divers went the deepest depths of the lake only to surface when the fish became larger than the divers. Another myth is the myth of StinkFoot, and StinkFoot Bridge. A close relative to BigFoot, StinkFoot lives under the Tippy Boat Co. marina sign on the foot bridge. StinkFoot has had a few sightings and some have even heard the screams of night travelers who have seen him.

References

External links

Tippecanoe Boat Co.

Tippecanoe
Lakes of Kosciusko County, Indiana
Glacial lakes of the United States
Tourist attractions in Kosciusko County, Indiana